Leonid and Friends is a Chicago tribute band based in Moscow. They started as a YouTube band and now also tours. The band leader and founder is Leonid Vorobyev (b. 1957 in Moscow, Russia). Vorobyev is a multi-instrumentalist, a recording studio sound engineer and choir conductor by training at the East Siberian Institute of Culture. Vorobyev made his first Chicago video recording in 2014 of the song Brand New Love Affair. With former Kyiv, Ukraine vocalist Serge Tiagniryadno, Leonid and Friends YouTube videos have gone viral, with views in the millions. Leonid & Friends have recorded three Chicago tribute albums, titled Chicagovich. After touring in Russia, the band first toured the United States in 2019. In 2018, songs by Earth, Wind, & Fire, Blood, Sweat & Tears, Tower of Power and The Ides of March were added to the playlist. Leonid Vorobyev's son, Roman Vorobyev (b.1991), is the band’s manager. The band's setup features bass and lead guitar, drums, keyboards, saxophone, trumpet and trombone, with occasional flugelhorn, French horn, flute, metal clarinet, cello and violin and miscellaneous percussion.

Discography

Albums
Three self-released albums (vich is Russian for son of):
Chicagovich - 50th Anniversary of the Band Chicago
Chicagovich II
Chicagovich III

Singles
 "The Speck of Dust" - a Leonid and Friends original single with lead vocals by Buzina Kseniya Yurievna, released in 2021 (written by Alexey Ashtaev, lyrics by Leonid Vorobyev and Roman Vorobyev)

Members

Current members

 Leonid Vorobyev – bass guitar, keyboards, piano, synth, backing and lead vocals 
 Igor Javad-Zade – drums, percussion 
 Vasily Akimov – lead and backing vocals, percussion, occasional rhythm guitar 
 Ksenia Buzina – backing and lead vocals, percussion 
 Andrey Zyl – trumpet, flugelhorn 
 Oleg Kudryavtsev – tenor and alto saxophones, flute, percussion, backing vocals 
 Maxim Likhachev – trombone, percussion 
 Sergey Kurmaev – keyboards, backing vocals 
 Konstantin Kovachev – lead guitar 
 Danil Buranov – lead and backing vocals, percussion 
 Mikhail Puntov (Michael Puntov) – lead and backing vocals

Past members
 Serge Tiagnyriadno – lead and backing vocals, rhythm guitar, keyboards, percussion  Serge returned to Ukraine to fight in the 2022 Russian invasion of Ukraine
 Dmitry Maximov – bass guitar 
 Sergey Kashirin – lead guitar, lead and backing vocals 
 Alexey Batychenko (1972-2021) – trumpet, flugelhorn 
 Alexandr Michurin – trombone, percussion 
 Konstantin Gorshkov – tenor saxophone 
 Vladimir Popov – baritone and alto saxophones, flute, percussion, backing vocals 
 Vlad Senchillo – keyboards, backing vocals

Other contributors
 Vladimir Osinsky – piano on "Colour My World"
 Ilya Prokudin – trumpet, flugelhorn on "You Are on My Mind" and "Spinning Wheel"
 Daniil Dubrovsky – alto, soprano and tenor saxophones on "Beginnings", "Street Player", "Hanky Panky/Life Saver", "Mongonucleosis" and "After the Love Has Gone"
 Ilya Vymenits – congas on "Hot Streets" and "Street Player"
 Jorgito Nunez – congas on "Hanky Panky/Life Saver"
 Rei Frometa – congas on "Call on Me", "Happy Man", "(I've Been) Searchin' So Long", "Mongonucleosis", "The Speck of Dust" and "So Very Hard to Go"
 Olga Andreeva – trumpet on "Got To Get You Into My Life"
 Roman Vorobyev – backing vocals and handclaps on "East River" and "Mongonucleosis" (also manager)
 Igor Baydikov – backing vocals and handclaps on "East River" and "Mongonucleosis"
 Yan Senchillo – backing vocals and handclaps on "East River" and "Mongonucleosis"
 Artur Gilfanov – trombone, percussion on "Mongonucleosis"
 Evgeny Kondratyev – trumpet, flugelhorn, percussion on "Mongonucleosis" and "After the Love Has Gone"
 Roman Koshkarov – keyboards on "If You Leave Me Now"
 Jacob Zakh – keyboards on "Just You 'n' Me", "You're the Inspiration" and "After the Love Has Gone"
 Mikhail Spasibo – keyboards on "Just You 'n' Me"
 Suren Kocharyan – baritone saxophone on "My Old School"
 Kirill Stekhov – alto saxophone on "My Old School"
 Dmitry Andrianov – guitar on "Ain't It Blue?"
 Valery Martynov – trumpet on "So Very Hard to Go" (also touring substitute 2022–present)
 Dmitry Gorevoy – baritone saxophone on "So Very Hard to Go"

Most members are from Moscow, though Tiagnyriadno, Kashirin, Zyl, Kurmaev and Kovachev hail from Ukraine, Moldova, Belarus, Kyrgyzstan and Kazakhstan respectively.

External links
Leonid & Friends: The Story So Far
Leonid & Friends: Behind The Music
Facebook

References

Musical groups established in 2014
Leonid and Friends 
Leonid and Friends
Russian rock music groups
Russian musical groups
Musical groups from Moscow